Tibor Šalát ( – ) was a Slovak mathematician, professor of mathematics, and Doctor of Mathematics who specialized in number theory and real analysis. He was the author and co-author of undergraduate and graduate textbooks in mathematics, mostly in Slovak. And most of his scholarly papers have been published in various scientific journals.

Life

In 1952 he went to work at the Faculty of Natural Sciences of Comenius University in Bratislava, where he became an assistant professor in 1962. He was appointed to a full professorship position in 1972. And in 1974, he earned a Ph.D. in Mathematics from the same institution.

He specialized in Cantor's expansions, uniform distribution, statistical convergence, summation methods and theory of numbers.

He wrote several undergraduate and graduate textbooks.

Academic papers

References

 P. Kostyrko, O. Strauch: Professor Tibor Šalát (1926-2005), Tatra Mt. Math. Publ. 31 (2005), 1-16 

Slovak mathematicians
Number theorists
Charles University alumni
Academic staff of Comenius University
1926 births
2005 deaths
Czechoslovak mathematicians